Martin Loïc Ako Assomo (born 21 December 1999) is a Cameroonian professional footballer who plays as a winger for APEJES Academy and the Cameroon national football team.

Club career 
In March 2021, Assomo signed for Latvian club Riga. He moved back to AS Fortuna in June 2021. On 8 July 2021, he scored a brace against his former club Eding Sport, to grant Fortuna a 4–0 victory.

International career 
He debuted with the senior Cameroon national team in a goalless draw friendly match against Nigeria on 8 June 2021, coming on in the 81st minute for James Léa Siliki. He also made the final 33 man squad and competed for Cameroon during the 2020 African Nations Championship.

References

External links 
 
 
 
 

Living people
1999 births
Cameroonian footballers
Association football midfielders
Cameroon international footballers
Cameroon youth international footballers
APEJES Academy players
Eding Sport FC players
Cameroon A' international footballers
2020 African Nations Championship players
Riga FC players
Cameroonian expatriate sportspeople in Latvia
Cameroonian expatriate footballers
Expatriate footballers in Latvia